Sveinbjörnsson is an Icelandic patronymic surname, literally meaning "son of Sveinbjörn". Notable people with the name include:

Bjarni Sveinbjörnsson (born 1963), Icelandic footballer
Haraldur Vignir Sveinbjörnsson (born 1975), Icelandic composer
Sveinbjörn Sveinbjörnsson (1847–1927), Icelandic composer

Icelandic-language surnames